The 1907 North Monaghan by-election was held on 20 June 1907.  The by-election was held due to the resignation of the incumbent Irish Parliamentary MP, Patrick O'Hare.  It was won by the Irish Parliamentary candidate James Carrige Rushe Lardner.

Lardner was elected unopposed, although his nomination as the Nationalist candidate had been opposed by the powerful Joseph Devlin, whose Ancient Order of Hibernians was in competition with the Irish National Foresters.

References

North Monaghan by-election
North Monaghan by-election
By-elections to the Parliament of the United Kingdom in County Monaghan constituencies
Unopposed by-elections to the Parliament of the United Kingdom (need citation)
1907 elections in Ireland